was a Japanese celebrity chef, food writer, and founder/leader of the charity "Kagurazaka Women's Choir".

Biography
Katsuyo Kobayashi was born in Osaka in 1937. A graduate of Tezukayama Gakuin College, she became a homemaker after marriage. When she got married at the age of 21, she couldn't cook although she was a homemaker. 

She started learning how to cook from her mother and neighbors who could cook well. In 1963, initiated by a letter to a TV program, her career as a gourmet scholar started: she got her own TV program at the local television station in Osaka. In 1970, she debuted as an essayist, and published many cookbooks and essays. She appeared on NHK's cooking programs such as “Kyou no Ryouri (Today’s Dinner)” for the last 26 years and received public attention. She also created household products. Her serving dish “Kiai” was awarded the Good Design Award by the Japan Institute of Design Promotion Organization, which is instituted by the Ministry of International Trade and Industry of Japan, in 1990. In 1994, she participated in Iron Chef and defeated Kenichi Chin, the Iron Chef of Chinese cuisine. In addition, her English cookbook “The Quick and Easy Japanese Cookbook” was awarded the Best Cookbook in Asia by the Gourmand World Cookbook Award in 2000. 
She published nearly 200 cookbooks and essays and she also supported people who are living in the disaster areas of the Great Hanshin-Awaji earthquake in 1995.

In 1994, she participated in the TV cooking contest Iron Chef, winning against Chen Kenichi.

Kobayashi, whose son Kentarō is also a celebrity chef, published more than 200 books.

A strong believer in Article 9 of the Japanese Constitution, she was one of the founders of Magazine 9.

After suffering a subarachnoid hemorrhage in 2005, she died on January 23, 2014, of multiple organ failure.

References

External links 
 Katsuyo recipes(smart phone site) 
 Katsuyo Kitchen 

1937 births
2014 deaths
Japanese chefs
Food writers
People from Osaka
Women food writers